Argyrana is a genus of moths of the family Noctuidae. The genus was erected by Paul Köhler in 1952.

Species
Argyrana bimorpha Olivares & Angulo, 2010 Chile
Argyrana excellens Köhler, 1952 Argentina (Chubut, Santa Cruz)
Argyrana paulokehleri Olivares & Angulo, 2010 Chile

References

Cuculliinae